Phyllocnistis wygodzinskyi is a moth of the family Gracillariidae, known from Argentina. It was described by German entomologist Erich Martin Hering in 1958. The larvae feed on Asteraceae species. They probably mine the leaves of their host plant.

References

Phyllocnistis
Endemic fauna of Argentina
Moths of South America